In modern Hebrew and Yiddish  (regular plural  ,  or ) is a term for a gentile, a non-Jew. Through Yiddish, the word has been adopted into English (pluralised as goys or goyim) also to mean gentile, sometimes with a pejorative sense. As a word principally used by Jews to describe non-Jews, it is a term for the ethnic exogroup.

The Biblical Hebrew word goy has been commonly translated into English as nation, meaning a group of persons of the same ethnic family who speak the same language (rather than the modern meaning of a political unit).  

The Biblical Hebrew word goy is used to describe both the Nation of Israel and other nations.

In English language Christian bibles, nation has been used as the principal translation for goy in the Hebrew Bible, from the earliest English language bibles such as the 1530 Tyndale Bible and the 1611 King James Version.

Hebrew Bible
The word  means "nation" in Biblical Hebrew. In the Torah,  and its variants appear 560 times in reference to both the Israelites and the non-Israelite nations.

Translations of 'goy' in English-language Christian Bibles
The King James Version of the Bible translates the word / as "nation" 374 times, "heathen" 143 times, "Gentile" 30 times (see Evolution of the Term below) and "people" 11 times. The New American Standard Bible translation uses the following words: "every nation" (2 times) Gentiles (1) Goiim (1), Harosheth-hagoyim* (3), herds (1), nation (120), nations (425), people (4).

Evolution of the term 

While the books of the Hebrew Bible often use  to describe the Israelites, the later Jewish writings of the Hellenistic Period (from approximately 300BCE to 30BCE) tended to apply the term to other nations.

Goy acquired the meaning of someone who is not Jewish in the first and second century CE. Before that time, academics 
Adi Ophir and Ishay Rosen-Zvi have argued, no crystallized dichotomy between Jew and non-Jew existed in Judaism. Ophir and Rosen-Zvi state that the early Jewish convert to Christianity, Paul, was key in developing the concept of "goy" to mean non-Jew:

The Latin words gentes/gentilis - which also referred to peoples or nations - began to be used to describe non-Jews in parallel with the evolution of the word  in Hebrew. Based on the Latin model, the English word "gentile" came to mean non-Jew from the time of the first English-language Bible translations in the 1500s (see Gentile).

The twelfth century Jewish scholar Maimonides defines goy in his Mishneh Torah as a worshipper of idolatry, as he explains, "Whenever we refer to a gentile [goy] without any further description, we mean one who worships false deities". Maimonides saw Christians as idolators (because of concepts like the Trinity) but not Muslims who he saw as more strictly monotheistic.

As a slur 
Goy can be used in a derogatory manner. The Yiddish lexicographer Leo Rosten in The New Joys of Yiddish defines goy as someone who is non-Jewish or someone who is dull, insensitive, or heartless. Goy also occurs in many pejorative Yiddish expressions:

 Dos ken nor a goy - Something only a goy would do or is capable of doing.
 A goy blabt a goy - "A goy stays a goy," or, less literally, according to Rosten, "What did you expect? Once an anti-Semite always an anti-Semite."
 Goyisher kopf - "Gentile head," someone who doesn't think ahead, an idiot.
 Goyishe naches - Pleasures or pursuits only a gentile would enjoy.
 A goy! - Exclamation of exasperation used "when endurance is exhausted, kindliness depleted, the effort to understand useless".

Several authors have opined on whether the word is derogatory. Dan Friedman, executive director of The Forward in "What 'Goy' Means, And Why I Keep Using It" writes that it can be used as an insult but that the word is not offensive. He compares it to the word "foreigners" which Americans can use dismissively but which isn't a derogatory word. Similarly, Jews for Racial and Economic Justice (JFREJ) has stated that "goy" is "Not an insult, just kinda sounds like it."

Rebecca Einstein Schorr argues that the word has an established pejorative overtone. She refers to the observation "the goyishe groomsmen were all drunk and bawdy; of course, you’d never see that at a Jewish wedding" and "goyishe kop" where the word is used in a pejorative sense. She admits that the word can have non-pejorative uses, such as "goyishe restaurant" - one that doesn't serve kosher food - but contends that the word is "neutral, at best, and extremely offensive, at worst." Andrew Silow Carroll writes:

Nahma Nadich, deputy director of the Jewish Community Relations of Greater Boston writes: "I definitely see goy as a slur — seldom used as a compliment, and never used in the presence of a non-Jew" adding "That's a good litmus test: if you wouldn't use a word in the presence of someone you’re describing, good chance it’s offensive."

In antisemitism 
According to the Southern Poverty Law Center, the term "goy" has been used ironically by white supremacists to refer to themselves to signal a belief in conspiracy theories about Jews. For example, a Hungarian antisemitic motorcycle association refers to themselves as the Goyim riders, and in 2020 one activist tried to rename the far-right group the Proud Boys to the Proud Goys. In a similar vein, in 2017, the far-right American Traditionalist Worker Party created the crowdfunding platform called GoyFundMe, a wordplay on the popular crowdfunding platform GoFundMe. The Goyim Defense League and its website, GoyimTV, are another example.

The word also features in the alt-right catchphrase or meme "The Goyim Know, Shut It Down" associated with online forums such as 4chan and 8chan. In this context, the speaker assumes the role of a panicked Jew who reacts to an event that would reveal Jewish manipulations or Jewish deceitfulness. According to the Anti-Defamation League, the meme first appeared in 2013 on 4chan.

See also 
 Gadjo
 Ger toshav

References

External links 
 

Ethno-cultural designations
Exonyms
Hebrew words and phrases in the Hebrew Bible
Jewish culture
Judaism terminology
Yiddish words and phrases